Save Me is a British television drama series, written, created by, and starring Lennie James. It was first broadcast on Sky Atlantic on 28 February 2018, with all six episodes being released via Sky Box Sets and Now TV on the same day. Series two, entitled Save Me Too, was released in the same fashion on 1 April 2020.

Sky Vision distributed the first series worldwide, but the distribution rights for the second series were picked up by Sky's sister company NBCUniversal. In the U.S., the series was picked up by Starz, where the series has been available on Starz on Demand since 6 September 2018. It was released on Starz Cinema on 11 May 2019.

The series stars Lennie James as Nelson "Nelly" Rowe, a down-and-out whose life is turned upside down when Jody, the estranged daughter he fathered thirteen years ago, mysteriously disappears. He begins a determined quest to get to the bottom of things and find his daughter, lying, begging favours and stretching his friendships to the limit in the process. Suranne Jones stars as Claire McGory, Jody's mother. Aside from James and Jones, Stephen Graham and Jason Flemyng as friends Melon and Tam are also credited as principal members of the cast.

The series was green-lit in January 2017, under the original working title of Gone. James reunited with World Productions for the series, with whom he previously worked on the first series of Line of Duty.

Following strong critical reception for the first series, a second series was released in 2020, with the altered title Save Me Too. A DVD of the first series was released via Acorn Media on 7 May 2018. It won the 2021 BAFTA TV Award for Best Drama Series.

Cast

Main cast
 Lennie James as Nelson "Nelly" Rowe, a down-and-out, sofa-surfing womaniser
 Suranne Jones as Claire McGory, Nelly's former lover and mother of Jody
 Stephen Graham as Fabio "Melon" Melonzola, Nelly's best friend, a computer expert and convicted sex offender
 Jason Flemyng as Tam, a friend of Nelly's, a cross-dresser and strip club bartender
 Adrian Edmondson as Gideon Charles, a major figure in the paedophile ring
 Lesley Manville as Jennifer Charles, the wife of Gideon (season 2)

Recurring cast
 Susan Lynch as Stace, a childhood friend of Nelly's and landlady of The Palm Tree, his local pub
 Kerry Godliman as Martine "Teens" Betts, Nelly's girlfriend at the start of the series, whom he remains friends with afterwards
 Olivia Gray as Grace, trafficked teen whom Nelly saves and who resembles his missing daughter
 Nadine Marshall as Detective Sergeant Shola O'Halloran, DCI Thorpe's deputy
 Barry Ward as Barry McGory, Claire's husband and Jody's adoptive father, an apparently wealthy club owner
 Alan McKenna as Detective Chief Inspector Ian Thorpe, senior investigating officer into Jody's disappearance
 Indeyarna Donaldson-Holness as Jody McGory, Nelly and Claire's thirteen-year-old daughter and Barry's adopted daughter
 Phil Dunster as BJ McGory, Barry's son and Claire's stepson
 Thomas Coombes as Goz, a drug dealer and friend of Nelly's
 Alice Feetham as Bernie Melonzola, Melon's wife, whom he was convicted of having sex with when she was fifteen
 Camilla Beeput as Zita, Nelly's occasional girlfriend, a stripper
 Nicholas Croucher as Dylan, Jody's best friend and next-door neighbour
 Struan Rodger as Richard, owner of an illicit paedophile bar and brothel
 Ryan McKen as DC Leo Rainsford, a detective working on Jody's case
 Alexander Arnold as Luke, a student and regular at The Palm Tree
 Ragevan Vasan as Gavin, a student and regular at The Palm Tree, Luke's friend and flatmate
 Remmie Milner as Daisy, Goz's girlfriend and mother of his child
 Jimmy Walker as Marky Betts, Teens' son, a strip club doorman
 Mia Austen as PC Helen Long, the McGorys' family liaison officer

Other cast
 Rob Horrocks as Plain Clothes Police Officer

Episodes

Series 1 (2018)
Airdates listed as per the Sky Atlantic broadcast. All episodes of this series were available to download from Sky Box Sets and Now TV from 28 February 2018.

Series 2 (2020) 

All episodes of this series were available to download from Sky Box Sets and Now TV from 1 April 2020.

References

External links
 
 
 
 

2018 British television series debuts
2020 British television series endings
2010s British drama television series
2020s British drama television series
Kidnapping in television
Cross-dressing in television
English-language television shows
Infidelity in television
Prostitution in British television
Sky Atlantic original programming
Television series about dysfunctional families
Television series about missing people
Television shows set in London
Works about sex trafficking
Television series by ITV Studios
Television series by World Productions